The 4th annual Berlin International Film Festival was held from 18 to 29 June 1954. This year's festival did not give any official jury prizes, instead awards were given by audience voting. This continued until the FIAPF granted Berlin "A-Status" in 1956. David Lean won the Golden Bear by the audience voting for his film Hobson's Choice at the festival.

Films in competition
The following films were in competition for the Golden Bear award:

Key

{| class="wikitable" width="550" colspan="1"
| style="background:#FFDEAD;" align="center"| †
|Winner of the main award for best film in its section
|}

Awards
The following prizes were awarded by audience votes:
 Golden Bear: Hobson's Choice by David Lean
 Silver Bear: Pane, amore e fantasia by Luigi Comencini
 Bronze Berlin Bear: Le défroqué by Léo Joannon
 Big Gold Medal (Documentaries and Culture Films): The Living Desert by James Algar
 Big Silver Medal (Documentaries and Culture Films): Det stora äventyret by Arne Sucksdorff
 Big Bronze Medal (Documentaries and Culture Films):  by Paul Haesaerts

References

External links
 4th Berlin International Film Festival 1954
 1954 Berlin International Film Festival
 Berlin International Film Festival:1954 at Internet Movie Database

04
1954 film festivals
1954 in West Germany
1950s in Berlin